Edasjön is a lake located in the province of Uppland, Sweden.

References

Uppland
Lakes of Uppsala County